This is a list of awards and nominations received by American rapper Future.

He earned his first Grammy in a tie for Best Rap Performance at the 2019 Grammy Awards. He also has received numerous awards and nominations throughout his career as a rapper and musician. Drake's 2016 album Views, which includes a song featuring Future, was nominated for Album of the Year at the 2017 Grammy Awards. Future's frequent collaboration with Drake has won him an award of Best Group at the BET Awards in 2016. He has also won the award for Best Mixtape (2015) and Best Club Banger (2014) at the BET Hip Hop Awards for his mixtape 56 Nights and song "Move That Dope" respectively. His music video for the song "DnF" with P Reign and Drake has won him the Best Hip Hop Video award at the Much Music Video Awards in 2015. Future has received many nominations at the BET Awards and BET Hip Hop Awards from 2011 until 2017, and at the MTV Awards and Billboard Music Awards.

Awards and nominations

References 

Future